Leonidovka is a rural locality (a village) in Arslanovsky Selsoviet, Chishminsky District, Bashkortostan, Russia. The population was 48 as of 2010. There are 2 streets.

Geography 
Leonidovka is located 25 km northwest of Chishmy (the district's administrative centre) by road. Aminevo is the nearest rural locality.

References 

Rural localities in Chishminsky District